Thomas George Bedecki (May 4, 1929 – December 15, 1993) was a Canadian ice hockey player, and college ice hockey head coach at University of Ottawa, Colorado College, and Ohio State University.

Education 
Bedecki attended St. Francis Xavier University in Antigonish, Nova Scotia where he also played hockey. He earned an M.A. in Education from Springfield College in 1953.

Career as coach 
Bedecki started his head coaching career at University of Ottawa before accepting the same position at Colorado College in June 1955. At CC, Bedecki lead the Tigers to the school's second NCAA championship in 1957 with a 13–6 win over the Michigan Wolverines. The 13 goals remains tied (along with the 1950 Colorado College team) for most goals scored in an NCAA championship game. Bedecki resigned abruptly following his third season in 1958. He owned a 59–28–1 record as Colorado College's head coach.

In 1963, Ohio State University established a varsity ice hockey program and chose Bedecki as its first head coach. Bedecki coached the Buckeyes for two seasons compiling a 6–14–0 record before resigning in March 1965.

Head coaching record

References

External links
 Tom Bedecki Year-by-Year Coaching Record

1929 births
1993 deaths
St. Francis Xavier X-Men ice hockey players
Springfield College (Massachusetts) alumni
Colorado College Tigers men's ice hockey coaches
Ohio State Buckeyes men's ice hockey coaches